Four Roads is a village in Saint Philip in Barbados.

Populated places in Barbados
Saint Philip, Barbados